Limone sul Garda is a town and comune in the province of Brescia, in Lombardy (northern Italy), at the western bank of Lake Garda.

History
Between 1863 and 1905 the denomination of the comune was Limone San Giovanni.

On 13 September 1786, the famous German poet J. Wolfgang Goethe passed by the village by boat and described with these words its lemon gardens:

"We passed Limone, the mountain-gardens of which, laid out terrace-fashion, and planted with citron-trees, have a neat and rich appearance. The whole garden consists of rows of square white pillars placed at some distance from each other, and rising up the mountain in steps. On these pillars strong beams are laid, that the trees planted between them may be sheltered in the winter. The view of these pleasant objects was favored by a slow passage, and we had already passed Malcesine when the wind suddenly changed, took the direction usual in the day-time, and blew towards the north."

(Italian Journey, J. Wolfgang Goethe, 1816–17)

Until the 1940s, the town was reachable only by lake or through the mountains, with the road to Riva del Garda being completed in 1932, but today Limone is one of the most renowned tourist resorts in the area.

Municipal government
The  is chaired by the mayor, who appoints others members, called .

Since 1995, the mayor of Limone is directly elected by citizens, originally every four, then every five years. The current mayor is Antonio Martinelli, elected on 27 May 2019.

Health
In 1979, researchers discovered that people in Limone possess a mutant form of apolipoprotein (called ApoA-1 Milano) in their blood, that induced a healthy form of high-density cholesterol, which resulted in a lowered risk of atherosclerosis and other cardiovascular diseases.

The protein appears to have given residents of the village extreme longevity - a dozen of those living here are over the age of 100 (for c. 1,000 total inhabitants). The origin of the mutation has been traced back to a couple who lived in Limone in the 17th century. Research has been ongoing to develop pharmaceutical treatments against heart disease based on mimicking the beneficial effects of the ApoA-1 mutation.

Gallery

Sources

External links
Official Site

Cities and towns in Lombardy
Populated places on Lake Garda